4547 Massachusetts is a dark background asteroid from the central regions of the asteroid belt, approximately  in diameter. It was discovered on 16 May 1990, by Japanese astronomers Kin Endate and Kazuro Watanabe at the JCPM Sapporo Station  on the island of Hokkaido, Japan. The asteroid was named for the  U.S. state of Massachusetts.

Orbit and classification 

Massachusetts is a non-family asteroid of the main belt's background population. It orbits the Sun in the central asteroid belt at a distance of 2.4–2.8 AU once every 4 years and 3 months (1,543 days). Its orbit has an eccentricity of 0.07 and an inclination of 18° with respect to the ecliptic. The body's observation arc also begins at Nauchnij in October 1980, more than seven years prior to its official discovery observation at Sapporo.

Naming 

This minor planet was named after Massachusetts, the U.S. state in which the Minor Planet Center (MPC) is located. In the late 19th century, there had been an agricultural and technological knowledge transfer from Massachusetts to Hokkaido, where this asteroid was discovered. The Japanese island of Hokkaido and Massachusetts also have a sister-state relationship since 1990. The official naming citation was published by the MPC on 21 November 1991.

Physical characteristics 

In the SMASS classification, Massachusetts is an X-type asteroid, while the Wide-field Infrared Survey Explorer (WISE) characterizes it as a primitive P-type asteroid with an albedo of 0.0398.

Rotation period 

Photometric observations of Massachusetts during January 2006, by American Brian Warner at the Palmer Divide Observatory  in Colorado Springs, Colorado, were used to generate a well-defined lightcurve with a rotation period of 7.703 hours and a variation in brightness of 0.29 magnitude.

In February 2006, photometric observations by French amateur astronomer Pierre Antonini, gave a concurring period of 7.75 hours with a brightness amplitude of 0.27 magnitude.

Diameter and albedo 

According to the surveys carried out by the Infrared Astronomical Satellite IRAS, the Japanese Akari satellite and the NEOWISE mission of NASA's WISE telescope, Massachusetts measures between 21.85 and 33.395 kilometers in diameter and its surface has an albedo between 0.039 and 0.1184. The Collaborative Asteroid Lightcurve Link derives an albedo of 0.0695 and a diameter of 24.13 kilometers based on an absolute magnitude of 11.6.

Notes

References

External links 
 Lightcurve Database Query (LCDB), at www.minorplanet.info
 Dictionary of Minor Planet Names, Google books
 Asteroids and comets rotation curves, CdR – Observatoire de Genève, Raoul Behrend
 Discovery Circumstances: Numbered Minor Planets (1)-(5000) – Minor Planet Center
 
 

004547
Discoveries by Kin Endate
Discoveries by Kazuro Watanabe
Named minor planets
004547
19900516